Adam Svatoš (born June 16, 1979 Prague), known by his stage names MC Kato and Deph, is a Czech rapper, singer, songwriter, record producer and DJ. He gained recognition as the primary songwriting and performing member of hip-hop groups Chaozz and Rigor Mortiz. Later, he formed and led a hip-hop band named Prago Union.

As a member of rap duo Flavamatic, he began working with Chaozz in 1994 and later became the main figure in the band. He signed a deal with a major label, Dutch PolyGram, and achieved popularity outside the Czech hip hop community. As a result of the conditions of his contract with the label, he went broke after the end of Chaozz. Several years later, his album Dezorient Express received critical acclaim and started his comeback.

Due to his former problems with his thyroid gland, Svatoš has no teeth.

Discography 
...a nastal chaos (certified platinum in Czech, gold in Slovak) (1996)
Až na věky (1997)
Alpha & Omega (1997) w/ Philip Lawson
Zprdeleklika (certified gold in Czech, gold in Slovak) (1997)
Já nejsem rapper (1998)
P.E.S. (1999)
Sakum prdum (2001)
HDP (2005)
Dezorient Express (2010)
Metronom (2010)
V Barvách (2011)
Vážná hudba (2013)
Odložené chlebíčky (2013)
Smrt žije (2016)
Perpetuum promile (2019)
Made in Strašnice (2021)

References

1979 births
Place of birth missing (living people)
Living people
PolyGram artists
Czech rappers